Manuel Vilchez (born October 21, 1961) is a former Venezuelan boxer. At the 1984 Summer Olympics he lost in the first round of the men's bantamweight division (– 54 kg) to Uganda's John Siryakibbe. A year earlier he claimed the gold medal in the same division at the Pan American Games by defeating Pedro Nolasco of the Dominican Republic in the final.

Vilchez challenged Louie Espinoza for the World Boxing Association super-bantamweight title at Phoenix, Arizona, United States in 1987, but he lost by a 15th-round knockout.

1984 Olympic results
Below is the record of Manuel Vilchez, a Venezuelan bantamweight boxer who competed in the 1984 Los Angeles Olympics:

 Round of 64: lost to John Siryakibbe (Uganda) by decision, 2-3

References
Profile

1961 births
Living people
Bantamweight boxers
Olympic boxers of Venezuela
Boxers at the 1983 Pan American Games
Boxers at the 1984 Summer Olympics
Place of birth missing (living people)
Venezuelan male boxers
Pan American Games gold medalists for Venezuela
Pan American Games medalists in boxing
Medalists at the 1983 Pan American Games